The Offaly county hurling team represents Offaly in hurling and is governed by Offaly GAA, the county board of the Gaelic Athletic Association. The team competes in the Joe McDonagh Cup and the National Hurling League.

Offaly's home ground is O'Connor Park, Tullamore. The team's manager is Johnny Kelly.

The team last won the Leinster Senior Championship in 1995, the All-Ireland Senior Championship in 1998 and the National League in 1991.

History
After a scheme developed by the Gaelic Athletic Association in the 1970s to encourage the playing of hurling in non-traditional counties, Offaly was one of the first teams to benefit.  As a result, the county won six Leinster Senior Hurling Championship titles in the 1980s, as well as its first All-Ireland Senior Hurling Championship in 1981.

The county has since gone on to win three other All-Irelands. Perhaps Offaly's most famous win came in the All-Ireland Final of 1994 in what has come to be remembered as the "five minute final." Limerick looked set to win their first All-Ireland title since 1973 until Offaly staged one of the greatest comebacks of all time, scoring two goals and five points in the last five minutes. They defeated Limerick by 3–16 to 2–13.

In the 1998 All-Ireland Senior Hurling Championship semi-final, Offaly defeated All-Ireland champions Clare in a second replay. Offaly had lost the first replay after referee Jimmy Cooney blew for full-time too early, leading Offaly fans to blockade the pitch in protest.

Offaly conceded a walkover to Kildare in the 2020 Christy Ring Cup after an outbreak of COVID-19 forced "almost every member" of the panel into isolation due to Health Service Executive (HSE) advice that they were "close contacts". Later in the same competition, in the semi-final, Down knocked Offaly out in a first ever inter-county hurling penalty shootout.

Current panel

INJ Player has had an injury which has affected recent involvement with the county team.
RET Player has since retired from the county team.
WD Player has since withdrawn from the county team due to a non-injury issue.

Current management team
Manager: Johnny Kelly, appointed head of the 2023 season
Selectors: Barry Teehan (Coolderry)
Performance coach: Brendan Maher (Borris-Ileigh, Tipperary)
Goalkeeping coach: Colm Callanan (Kinvara, Galway)
Other backroom: Martin Maher (Brendan's brother)

Managerial history
Offaly have a history of appointing "foreign" managers. In 2016, the former Waterford hurler Kevin Ryan became Offaly's ninth "foreign" manager in a quarter of a century.

Andy Gallagher 1976–1983

Dermot Healy 1983–1986

Georgie Leahy 1986–1988

P. J. Whelahan 1988–1989

Paudge Mulhare 1989–1990

Pádraig Horan 1990–1992

Éamonn Cregan 1992–1996

John McIntyre 1996–1997

Babs Keating 1997–1998

Michael Bond 1998–1999

Pat Fleury 1999–2000

Michael Bond (2) 2000–2001

Tom Fogarty 2001–2002

Mike McNamara 2002–2004

John McIntyre (2) 2004–2007

Joe Dooley 2007–2011

Ollie Baker 2011–2013

Brian Whelahan 2013–2015

Éamonn Kelly 2015–2016

Kevin Ryan 2016–2017

Kevin Martin 2017–2019

Joachim Kelly 2019**

Michael Fennelly 2019–2022

Johnny Kelly Portumna 2022–

**=In a caretaker role

Players

Notable players

Records

Most appearances

Top scorers

All Stars

Colours and crest

Kit evolution

Team sponsorship
The food company Carroll's of Tullamore sponsored Offaly since the GAA first permitted shirt sponsorship deals in 1991 until 2021. It was the sport's longest running shirt sponsor. In 2022, Glenisk became the County's Camogie, Football and Hurling sponsors, with them becoming the Ladies Football sponsors in 2023 once their current sponsorship with CMG closes.

Professional golfer Shane Lowry and Offaly announced a five-year partnership in April 2021.

Honours

National
All-Ireland Senior Hurling Championship
 Winners (4): 1981, 1985, 1994, 1998
 Runners-up (3): 1984, 1995, 2000
Christy Ring Cup
 Winners (1): 2021
All-Ireland Junior Hurling Championship
 Winners (2): 1923, 1929
All-Ireland Under-20 Hurling Championship
 Runners-up (3): 1989, 1991, 1992
National Hurling League
 Winners (1): 1991
 Runners-up (2): 1980–81, 1987–88
National Hurling League Division 2
 Winners (4): 1966, 1988, 2005, 2009
National Hurling League Division 2A
 Winners (1): 2021
All-Ireland Minor Hurling Championship
 Winners (3): 1986, 1987, 1989
 Runners-up (1): 2022

Provincial
Leinster Senior Hurling Championship
 Winners (9): 1980, 1981, 1984, 1985, 1988, 1989, 1990, 1994, 1995
 Runners-up (14): 1901, 1924, 1926, 1928, 1969, 1982, 1983, 1986, 1987, 1996, 1998, 1999, 2000, 2004 
Leinster Junior Hurling Championship
 Winners (7): 1915, 1922, 1923, 1924, 1929, 1938, 1953
Leinster Under-21 Hurling Championship
 Winners (5): 1978, 1989, 1991, 1992, 2000
Leinster Minor Hurling Championship
 Winners (5): 1986, 1987, 1989, 2000, 2022
Walsh Cup
 Winners (5): 1977, 1981, 1990, 1993, 1994
Kehoe Cup
 Winners (1): 2020

U16 arrabawn all Ireland hurling division A shield: 1
 2016
U17 Celtic challenge division 1 shield: 1
 2016

References

 
County hurling teams